Lee Seon-ho (born December 14, 1981) is a South Korean actor.

Filmography

Television series

Film

References

External links 
 Lee Seon-ho at Huayi Brothers  
 Lee Seon-ho at Naver 
 
 
 

1981 births
Living people
South Korean male television actors
South Korean male film actors